Louis Morris Crump (May 21, 1916 – April 6, 2019) was an American politician in the state of Texas. Crump was born in Santa Anna, Texas. He was a lawyer, residing in San Saba, Texas. He served in the Texas State Senate from 1959 to 1967 as a Democrat from the 16th district. From 1963 to 1967, he served as president pro tempore of the state senate. He turned 100 in May 2016 and died at the age of 102 in 2019.

References

1916 births
2019 deaths
American centenarians
Men centenarians
People from Santa Anna, Texas
Texas lawyers
Presidents pro tempore of the Texas Senate
Democratic Party Texas state senators
People from San Saba, Texas
20th-century American lawyers